This is a list of production functions that have been used in the economics literature. Production functions are a key part of modelling national output and national income.  For a much more extensive discussion of various types of production functions and their properties, their relationships and origin, see Chambers (1988) and Sickles and Zelenyuk (2019, Chapter 6).
 

The production functions listed below, and their properties are shown for the case of two factors of production, capital (K), and labor (L), mostly for heuristic purposes. These functions and their properties are easily generalizable to include additional factors of production (like land, natural resources, entrepreneurship, etc.)

Technology

There are three common ways to incorporate technology (or the efficiency with which factors of production are used) into a production function (here A is a scale factor, F is a production function, and Y is the amount of physical output produced):
 Hicks-neutral technology, or "factor augmenting":  
 Harrod-neutral technology, or "labor augmenting":  
 Solow-neutral technology, or "capital augmenting":

Elasticity of substitution

The elasticity of substitution between factors of production is a measure of how easily one factor can be substituted for another. With two factors of production, say, K and L, it is a measure of the curvature of a production isoquant. The mathematical definition is:

where "slope" denotes the slope of the isoquant, given by

Returns to scale

Returns to scale can be
 Increasing returns to scale: doubling all input usages more than doubles output. 
 Decreasing returns to scale: doubling all input usages less than doubles output.
 Constant returns to scale: doubling all input usages exactly doubles output.

Some widely used forms
 Constant elasticity of substitution (CES) function: 
, with  

which includes the special cases of:

Linear production (or perfect substitutes) 
 when 
Cobb–Douglas production function  (or imperfect complements) 
 when 
Leontief production function (or perfect complements) 
 when 

Translog, a linear approximation of CES via a Taylor polynomial about 

Stone-Geary,a variation of the Cobb-Douglas production function that considers existence of a threshold factor requirement (represented by ) of each output

Some Exotic Production Functions
Variable Elasticity of Substitution Production Function (VES)

Transcendental Production Function 

Constant Marginal Value Share (CMS)

Spillman Production Function (This function is referenced in Agricultural Economics Research)

von Liebig Production Function

where  is the maximal yield (considers capacity limits).

References 

Production economics
Production functions